The Embassy of the Republic of Madagascar in Moscow is the diplomatic mission of Madagascar in the Russian Federation. It is located at 5 Kursovoy Lane in the Khamovniki District of Moscow.

See also 
 Madagascar–Russia relations
 Diplomatic missions in Russia

References

External links 
  Embassy of Madagascar in Moscow

Madagascar–Russia relations
Madagascar
Moscow
Khamovniki District